Vaccarella is a surname. In origin, it is a feminine form of the Italian word vaccaro ('cowherd'), thus meaning 'female cowherd'. Notable people with the surname include:

Nino Vaccarella (1933-2021), Italian racing driver
Rockey Vaccarella, American activist

References